Test Pilot Donald is a 1951 American animated short film featuring Donald Duck and Chip 'n' Dale. The cartoon was directed by Jack Hannah and produced by Walt Disney. In the film, Donald files his model airplane into Chip 'n Dale's tree. Dale climbs in and proceeds to cause trouble.

Plot 
Donald Duck is at the park flying a tether airplane, unaware he is being watched by Chip 'n' Dale. Chip is uninterested, but Dale is mesmerized and dreams of flying the plane. When it gets stuck in their tree, Dale hops aboard and zooms around the tree, but the airplane breaks down and lands. Dale fixes the plane, but Donald puts him under a jug, while Chip disciplines Dale for his foolishness. Dale steals the now-untethered plane and begins chasing and attacking Donald. Donald hooks the plane with a fishing rod, but is pulled along on a wild ride, until he manages to reel himself in and get aboard the plane. Seeing this, Dale parachutes out. The fishing rod gets caught on the roof of a building, making the plane spin around and around. Later that night, Chip and Dale go to bed, while watching Donald still circling the building.

Voice cast
 Clarence Nash as Donald Duck
 James MacDonald and Dessie Flynn as Chip and Dale

Television
 Disneyland, episode #3.13: "Your Host, Donald Duck"
 The Mouse Factory, episode #1.14: "Aviation"
 The New Mickey Mouse Club, episodes C-057 (May 6, 1977) and D-072 (April 25, 1978)
 Good Morning, Mickey, episode #66
 Come Fly With Disney
 Mickey's Mouse Tracks, episode #20
 Donald's Quack Attack, episode #63
 The Ink and Paint Club, episode #1.48: "The Return of Chip 'n Dale"

Home media
The short was released on November 11, 2008, on Walt Disney Treasures: The Chronological Donald, Volume Four: 1951-1961.

Additional releases include:
 Walt Disney Cartoon Classics: The Continuing Adventures of Chip 'n' Dale with Donald Duck (VHS), which uses the original opening and closing titles.

References

External links 
 
 Test Pilot Donald at The Internet Animation Database
 Test Pilot Donald on Filmaffinity

Donald Duck short films
Films produced by Walt Disney
1950s Disney animated short films
Films directed by Jack Hannah
1951 animated films
1951 films
Films scored by Paul Smith (film and television composer)
1950s English-language films
Chip 'n' Dale films